The 2020 Hong Kong pro-democracy primaries were held on 11 and 12 July 2020 for selecting the numbers of pro-democracy candidates for the subsequently postponed 2020 Legislative Council election to maximise the chance for the pro-democrats to achieve a majority in the 70-seat Legislative Council.

With a turnout of more than 600,000, which equals to nearly half of votes received by the pro-democracy camp in the 2016 general election, it was the most-participated primary held in the history of Hong Kong since the 1997 handover, despite the SAR government's threats of the organisers' potential breaching of the newly imposed national security law.

Traditional pro-democrat parties lost ground to the localist new faces, with an unofficial six-person alliance led by Joshua Wong and Nathan Law of the disbanded Demosistō becoming the biggest winner in the primaries. The candidates they endorsed also emerged as either top or runner-up candidates in their respective constituencies.

53 candidates and participants were arrested under the national security law on 6 January 2021, of which 47 were officially charged with conspiracy to commit subversion.

Background
In 2019 amid the historic anti-extradition protests and the pro-democracy landslide in the District Council elections, legal scholar Benny Tai, one of the initiators of the 2014 Occupy protests, put forward a plan for the pro-democrats to win a majority of the seats in the Legislative Council to block the government's bills including the expected legislation of the Article 23 of the Basic Law which would in turn put pressure on the government to implement the five key demands of the protest movement. Based on prior experience, where excessive numbers of candidates split the pro-democratic votes in the 2016 election, he proposed a primary election within the pro-democracy camp to maximise the chance for the pro-democrats to win more seats by setting a limit on the numbers of candidates and avoid wasting votes.

Mechanism
To be eligible for the primaries, each candidate had to obtain at least 100 registered voter nominations and pay a deposit of HK$10,000. The election, organised by Benny Tai and former Legislative Council member Au Nok-hin, coordinated by Power for Democracy, was set to take place from 11 to 12 July between 9 am and 9 pm. The voting system was designed by the Hong Kong Public Opinion Research Institute (PORI), which also conducted polls on the recommended candidates. The surveyed results would be used to consolidate the final list of nominees for each seat in the official election in September. Voters were required to submit proof of residency or electoral register identification, and bring a smartphone to designated polling stations where they would scan the QR code and fill out their personal details to vote.

Nominations
A total of 52 nomination lists were received during the nomination period for all five geographical constituencies, the five-seat District Council (Second) and Health Services functional constituency. Most potential candidates pledged their willingness to coordinate with organisers, except for political party Civic Passion and New Territories East candidate Law Ting-fai who declined to join the primaries.

The Kwai Chung-based small political group Neighbourhood and Worker's Service Centre (NWSC) which held one seat in the legislature also declared they would not follow the agreement in which a losing candidate in the primaries would not participate in the general election. Instead, the NWSC suggested it may drop out in the latter stage if the poll numbers suggested the candidate had no chance of winning. There was a backlash among the pro-democrats towards the NWSC, which was accused of undermining the mechanism of the primaries. The NWSC later withdrew their candidacy altogether and stated that they would not field any candidate in the general election.

Security law and legal threats
On 30 June, the National People's Congress Standing Committee (NPCSC) approved the final draft of the national security legislation for Hong Kong. Hours after the approval, leading members of pro-democracy group Demosistō Joshua Wong, Nathan Law, Agnes Chow and Jeffrey Ngo announced their departure from the party. Demosistō members had been repeatedly barred from standing for election with authorities citing their previous stance on "self-determination" for the city, of which Wong and Law were also running in the upcoming primaries as Demosistō members. Subsequently, Demosistō declared that it would disband after the mass resignations on the same day. Few days after, Nathan Law said he had fled Hong Kong in response to the security law. He later dropped out from the primaries and endorsed Tiffany Yuen.

Secretary for Constitutional and Mainland Affairs Erick Tsang warned that the primaries might violate the new Beijing-imposed national security law. Tsang said one of the objectives of the primaries was to win a majority of seats in the legislature and subsequently vote against the budget. He added this could contravene clauses in the new law prohibiting secession, subversion and collusion with foreign powers. Benny Tai refuted the claim by saying such advocacy work was in accordance with the principles of the Basic Law. He added that vetoing the budget would not constitute "seriously interfering in, disrupting, or undermining the performance of duties and functions" of the government under Article 22 of the new law because the chief executive has the power to dismiss the legislature and call a by-election.

On 10 July one day before the primaries, the Housing Authority sent out a mass letter saying all District Councillors were barred from using their offices as polling stations or for any purposes other than related to district council activities. It warned that action might be taken against the District Councillors who were found to have violated terms in their rental contracts. A pro-democracy ice cream shop also had to scrap the plan to become a polling station after the property managers warned their participation could violate the tenancy agreement. At night, Hong Kong Police raided the Public Opinion Research Institute (PORI) office in Wong Chuk Hang, accusing the organisation of dishonest use of a computer. Au Nok-hin said the police move was to suppress the weekend voting and cast a "deterrent effect" on organisers and supporters.

Results

Over 590,000 electronic ballots and more than 20,000 paper ballots were recorded throughout the two-day vote, more than 13 per cent of the total number of registered voters and far exceeding the organisers' expected turnout of 170,000. Despite the national security law and legal threats, "Hong Kong people have made history again – another miracle happened in Hong Kong," Benny Tai said. "Hong Kong people – after all these years, since 2003 – have demonstrated to the world, and also to the authorities, that we have not given up to strive for democracy."

Traditional parties lost ground in most of the direct constituencies to the localist new faces, with Democratic Party incumbent legislator Helena Wong only coming seventh in her Kowloon West constituency. Former legislator "Long Hair" Leung Kwok-hung of the League of Social Democrats managed only ninth place in New Territories East for which only the top seven candidates would run in the general election. Joseph Lee, incumbent legislator of the Health Services constituency lost to Winnie Yu of the labour union Hospital Authority Employees Alliance, which had launched a labour strike during the anti-extradition bill protests. Candidates from numerous small parties were wiped out, including Carol Ng from the Labour Party, who lost in New Territories West.

Localist candidates emerged as the new force in the primaries, with an unofficial six-person alliance led by former Demosistō secretary-general Joshua Wong, incumbent legislator Eddie Chu and endorsed by withdrawn candidate Nathan Law, all became either the top or runner-up candidate in their respective constituencies. Wong himself was the top candidate in Kowloon East, while Eddie Chu and former journalist Gwyneth Ho and came first in New Territories West and New Territories East respectively. Tiffany Yuen who was endorsed by Nathan Law and activist Sunny Cheung also came in second in Hong Kong Island and Kowloon West respectively, while activist Lester Shum came in second in the District Council (Second) and Winnie Yu won the Health Services functional constituency.

|-
! scope=col style="background-color:#E9E9E9" colspan=3 rowspan=2 |Political Affiliation
! scope=col style="background-color:#E9E9E9" colspan=4 |Geographical Constituencies
! scope=col style="background-color:#E9E9E9" colspan=4 |Functional Constituencies
! scope=col style="background-color:#E9E9E9" rowspan=2 |Totalelected
|-
! style="background-color:#E9E9E9" |Popular vote
! style="background-color:#E9E9E9" |%
! style="background-color:#E9E9E9" |List
! style="background-color:#E9E9E9" |Elected
! style="background-color:#E9E9E9" |Popular vote
! style="background-color:#E9E9E9" |%
! style="background-color:#E9E9E9" |List
! style="background-color:#E9E9E9" |Elected
|-
| style="background-color:LightGreen;border-bottom-style:hidden;" rowspan="11"|
| width=1px style="background-color: " |
| align=left| Democratic Party
| 77,251 || 12.78 || 5 || 4 || 318,621 || 59.75 || 2 || 2 || 6 
|-
| width=1px style="background-color: " |
| align=left| Civic Party
| 73,054 || 12.08 || 4 || 4 || 10,579 || 1.98 || 1 || 0 || 4 
|-
| width=1px style="background-color: " |
| align=left| People Power
| 28,081 || 4.64 || 2 || 2 ||  ||  ||  ||  || 2
|-
| width=1px style="background-color: " |
| align=left| League of Social Democrats
| 34,962 || 5.78 || 2 || 1 ||  ||  ||  ||  || 1
|-
| width=1px style="background-color: " |
| align=left| Neo Democrats
| 15,021 || 2.48 || 2 || 1 ||  ||  ||  ||  || 1
|-
| width=1px style="background-color: " |
| align=left| HK First
| 9,308 || 1.54 || 1 || 1 ||  ||  ||  ||  || 1
|-
| width=1px style="background-color: " |
| align=left| Hong Kong Association for Democracy and People's Livelihood
| 8,776 || 1.45 || 2 || 1 ||  ||  ||  ||  || 1
|-
| width=1px style="background-color: " |
| align=left| Labour Party
| 10,860 || 1.80 || 1 || 0 ||  ||  ||  ||  || 0
|-
| width=1px style="background-color: " |
| align=left| Community Alliance
| 1,489 || 0.25 || 1 || 0 ||  ||  ||  ||  || 0
|-
| width=1px style="background-color: " |
| align=left| Professionals Guild
|   ||  ||  ||  || 218 || 0.04 || 1 || 0 || 0 
|-
| width=1px style="background-color: " |
| align=left| Independent democrats
|   ||  ||  ||  || 54 || 0.01 || 1 || 0 || 0 
|- style="background-color:LightGreen;font-weight:bold"
| align=left style="background-color:LightGreen" colspan=3 | Total for traditional democrats
| 258,802 || 42.80 || 20 || 14|| 329,472 || 61.78 || 5 || 2 || 16
|-
| style="background-color:Moccasin;border-bottom-style:hidden;" rowspan="6"|
| width=1px style="background-color: " |
| align=left| Tuen Mun Community Network
| 35,513 || 5.87 || 1 || 1 ||  ||  ||  ||  || 1
|-
| width=1px style="background-color: " |
| align=left| Tin Shui Wai Connection
| 20,525 || 3.39 || 1 || 1 ||  ||  ||  ||  || 1
|-
| width=1px style="background-color: " |
| align=left| Peninsular Commons
| 7,671 || 1.27 || 1 || 0 ||  ||  ||  ||  || 0
|-
| width=1px style="background-color: #000000" |
| align=left| Team Pang Cheuk-kei
| 2,880 || 0.48 || 1 || 0 ||  ||  ||  ||  || 0
|-
| width=1px style="background-color: #E4051E" |
| align=left| Hospital Authority Employees Alliance
|   ||  ||  ||  || 2,493 || 0.47 || 1 || 1 || 1
|-
| width=1px style="background-color: " |
| align=left| Independent localists
| 263,546 || 43.59 || 14 || 10 || 200,780 || 37.65 || 2 || 2 || 12
|-
|- style="background-color:Moccasin;font-weight:bold"
| align=left style="background-color:Moccasin;" colspan=3 | Total for localists
| 330,135 || 54.60 || 18 || 12 || 203,273 || 38.12 || 3 || 3 || 15
|-
| width=1px style="background-color:#DDDDDD"  rowspan=2 |
| width=1px style="background-color: #920C51" |
| align=left| Chai Wan Startup
| 7,974 || 1.32 || 1 || 0 ||  ||  ||  ||  || 0
|-
| width=1px style="background-color:#DDDDDD" |
| align=left| Non-aligned independents
| 7,749 || 1.28 || 3 || 0 || 516|| 0.10 || 1 || 0 || 0
|- style="font-weight:bold;background-color:#E9E9E9"
| align=left style="background-color:#E9E9E9" colspan="3"|Total
|604,660
|100.00
|42
|26
|533,261
|100.00
|9
|5
|31
|- style="font-weight:bold;background-color:#E9E9E9"
| align=left style="background-color:#E9E9E9" colspan="3"|Total valid votes
|604,660
|99.65
|rowspan=4 colspan=2|
|533,261
|100.00
|rowspan=4 colspan=3|
|- style="font-weight:bold;background-color:#E9E9E9"
| align=left style="background-color:#E9E9E9" colspan="3"|Invalid votes
| 2,101
| 0.35
| 
| 
|- style="font-weight:bold;background-color:#E9E9E9"
| align=left style="background-color:#E9E9E9" colspan="3"|Total votes / turnout
| 606,761
| 13.62
| 533,261
| 12.61
|- style="font-weight:bold;background-color:#E9E9E9"
| align=left style="background-color:#E9E9E9" colspan="3"|Registered voters
| 4,455,331
| 100.00
| 4,228,096
| 100.00
|}

Geographical Constituencies

Functional Constituencies

Responses
Chief Executive Carrie Lam issued a strong warning to the candidates and organisers of the primaries, saying it was subversive for them to vow to seize control of the legislature and vote down key government proposals. "If this so-called primary election's purpose is to achieve the ultimate goal of delivering what they called '35+' [lawmakers], with the objective of objecting or resisting every policy initiative of the HKSAR government, it may fall into the category of subverting the state power – one of the four types of offences under the national security law," she said.

A spokesman for Beijing's Liaison Office in Hong Kong condemned the opposition camp for ignoring the Hong Kong government's warning of possible legal breaches and pressing ahead with the primary. "It is a serious provocation to the current election system, seriously damages the fairness and impartiality of the Legislative Council election, and seriously harms to the legal rights and interests of other candidates," the office wrote. It named Benny Tai as a suspect in a possible breach of the national security law by coordinating with the opposition camp to seek control of the legislature, vote down the budget, paralyse the government and subvert the state power. It also accused Tai and the opposition of aiming to take over the city's governance by staging the Hong Kong version of a "colour revolution". The Hong Kong and Macau Affairs Office (HKMAO) also accused organiser Benny Tai of "illegally manipulating" the Hong Kong's electoral system, challenging the new national security law and acting as a political agent for foreign forces.

Benny Tai defended that the candidates were not seeking to undermine the performance of duties and functions by the body of power of the central government or of Hong Kong, referring to their agreement that pro-democrats should veto the budget if they were voted into the legislature. "Legco’s power of vetoing the budget is stated in the Basic Law," he said. "How can a power that is recognised by the Basic Law be breaching the national security law?" Amid the threats from the Beijing authorities, Au Nok-hin announced on 15 July that he would step down as the organiser of the primaries.

U.S. Secretary of State Mike Pompeo congratulated the success of the primaries and said the United States was gravely concerned over Carrie Lam's warning that the primaries might have violated the new national security law. In a statement, Pompeo said Washington would be watching developments in Hong Kong closely and urged the Legislative Council general election in September to be "equally free and fair".

Arrests and trials

53 pro-democracy activists were arrested on the morning of 6 January 2021 under the new national security law over their organisation and participation in the primaries including six organizers and 47 participants. The police also searched 72 places including home of jailed activist Joshua Wong, the offices of news outlets Apple Daily, Stand News and InMedia HK and froze more than $200,000 in funds related to the effort. Maya Wang of Human Rights Watch issued a statement condemning the arrests: "The Chinese government has decided to mark 2021 with sweeping arrests of over 50 prominent pro-democracy activists in Hong Kong, removing the remaining veneer of democracy in the city. Beijing once again has failed to learn from its mistakes in Hong Kong: that repression generates resistance, and that millions of Hong Kong people will persist in their struggle for their right to vote and run for office in a democratically elected government." The arrests also received a round of international criticism. British Foreign Secretary Dominic Raab called "the mass arrest of politicians and activists in Hong Kong is a grievous attack on Hong Kong’s rights and freedoms as protected under the Joint Declaration."

On 28 February 2021, of the 55 pro-democracy figures initially arrested in January, 47 were officially charged with conspiracy to commit subversion under the national security law.

See also
 2020 Hong Kong Legislative Council candidates' disqualification controversy
 Postponement of the 2020 Hong Kong legislative election

Notes

References

2021 Hong Kong legislative election
July 2020 events in China
Primary elections in Hong Kong